Radge Weekend Starts Here is the fifteenth studio album by King Creosote, released in 2001.

Track listing
Laid When I'm Lucky    
With Hindsight Blues      
No Daddy      
Handswashed       
Creos'medleyote:Kir(kc)aldy / Fun(Kc)Rap / Fol(Kc)Ough     
High Wire      
Heaven Come Down Tonight     
Life Of Lows     
Far From Saving Grace     
Mantra-Rap     
Whats With The Frown?      
Were I Not So Tired Xhösa

2001 albums
King Creosote albums